Biliverdin reductase A is a protein that in humans is encoded by the BLVRA gene.

Function

The protein encoded by this gene belongs to the biliverdin reductase family, members of which catalyze the conversion of biliverdin to bilirubin in the presence of NADPH or NADH.

Clinical significance 

Mutations in this gene are associated with hyperbiliverdinemia.

References

External links
 
 PDBe-KB provides an overview of all the structure information available in the PDB for Human Biliverdin reductase A

EC 1.3.1